Tetrodotoxin (TTX) is a potent neurotoxin. Its name derives from Tetraodontiformes, an order that includes pufferfish, porcupinefish, ocean sunfish, and triggerfish; several of these species carry the toxin. Although tetrodotoxin was discovered in these fish and found in several other animals (e.g., in blue-ringed octopuses, rough-skinned newts, and moon snails), it is actually produced by certain infecting or symbiotic bacteria like Pseudoalteromonas, Pseudomonas, and Vibrio as well as other species found in animals.

Tetrodotoxin is a sodium channel blocker. It inhibits the firing of action potentials in neurons by binding to the voltage-gated sodium channels in nerve cell membranes and blocking the passage of sodium ions (responsible for the rising phase of an action potential) into the neuron. This prevents the nervous system from carrying messages and thus muscles from contracting in response to nervous stimulation.

Its mechanism of action, selective blocking of the sodium channel, was shown definitively in 1964 by Toshio Narahashi and John W. Moore at Duke University, using the sucrose gap voltage clamp technique.

Sources in nature 
Apart from their bacterial species of most likely ultimate biosynthetic origin (see below), tetrodotoxin has been isolated from widely differing animal species, including:

 all octopuses and cuttlefish in small amounts, but specifically several species of the blue-ringed octopus, including Hapalochlaena maculosa (where it was called "maculotoxin"),
 various pufferfish species,
 certain angelfish, 
 species of Nassarius gastropods,
 species of Naticidae (moon snails),
 several starfish, including Astropecten species,
 several species of xanthid crabs.
 species of Chaetognatha (arrow worms),
 species of Nemertea (ribbon worms),
 a polyclad flatworm,
 land planarians of the genus Bipalium,
 toads of the genus Atelopus,
 toads of the genus Brachycephalus,
 the eastern newt (Notophthalmus viridescens) 
 the western or rough-skinned newts (Taricha; wherein it was originally termed "tarichatoxin"),

Tarichatoxin was shown to be identical to TTX in 1964 by Mosher et al., and the identity of maculotoxin and TTX was reported in Science in 1978, and the synonymity of these two toxins is supported in modern reports (e.g., at Pubchem and in modern toxicology textbooks) though historic monographs questioning this continue in reprint.

The toxin is variously used by metazoans as a defensive biotoxin to ward off predation, or as both a defensive and predatory venom (e.g., in octopuses, chaetognaths, and ribbon worms). Even though the toxin acts as a defense mechanism, some predators such as the common garter snake have developed insensitivity to TTX, which allows them to prey upon toxic newts.

The association of TTX with consumed, infecting, or symbiotic bacterial populations within the metazoan species from which it is isolated is relatively clear; presence of TTX-producing bacteria within a metazoan's microbiome is determined by culture methods, the presence of the toxin by chemical analysis, and the association of the bacteria with TTX production by toxicity assay of media in which suspected bacteria are grown. As Lago et al. note, "there is good evidence that uptake of bacteria producing TTX is an important element of TTX toxicity in marine metazoans that present this toxin." TTX-producing bacteria include Actinomyces, Aeromonas, Alteromonas, Bacillus, Pseudomonas, and Vibrio species; in the following animals, specific bacterial species have been implicated:

 Aeromonas species from the puffer fish, Takifugu obscurus,
 Aeromonas, Pseudomonas, and Vibrio species from the gastropod Nassarius conoidalis,
 Alteromonas, Bacillus, Pseudomonas, and Vibrio species from the Southern blue-ringed octopus, Hapalochlaena maculosa,
 Vibrio alginolyticus, from the starfish species Astropecten polyacanthus,
 Vibrio species including Vibrio alginolyticus, from the puffer fish, Takifugu vermicularis,
 Vibrio species including Vibrio alginolyticus again, in arrow worms, phylum Chaetognatha,
 Vibrio species, again, in ribbon worms, phylum Nemertea.

The association of bacterial species with the production of the toxin is unequivocal – Lago and coworkers state, "[e]ndocellular symbiotic bacteria have been proposed as a possible source of eukaryotic TTX by means of an exogenous pathway," and Chau and coworkers note that the "widespread occurrence of TTX in phylogenetically distinct organisms… strongly suggests that symbiotic bacteria play a role in TTX biosynthesis" – although the correlation has been extended to most but not all metazoans in which the toxin has been identified. To the contrary, there has been a failure in a single case, that of newts (Taricha granulosa), to detect TTX-producing bacteria in the tissues with highest toxin levels (skin, ovaries, muscle), using PCR methods, although technical concerns about the approach have been raised. Critically for the general argument, Takifugu rubripes puffers captured and raised in laboratory on controlled, TTX-free diets "lose toxicity over time," while cultured, TTX-free Takifugu niphobles puffers fed on TTX-containing diets saw TTX in the livers of the fishes increase to toxic levels. Hence, as bacterial species that produce TTX are broadly present in aquatic sediments, a strong case is made for ingestion of TTX and/or TTX-producing bacteria, with accumulation and possible subsequent colonization and production. Nevertheless, without clear biosynthetic pathways (not yet found in metazoans, but shown for bacteria), it remains uncertain whether it is simply via bacteria that each metazoan accumulates TTX; the question remains as to whether the quantities can be sufficiently explained by ingestion, ingestion plus colonization, or some other mechanism.

Biochemistry 
Tetrodotoxin binds to what is known as site 1 of the fast voltage-gated sodium channel.  Site 1 is located at the extracellular pore opening of the ion channel. The binding of any molecules to this site will temporarily disable the function of the ion channel, thereby blocking the passage of sodium ions into the nerve cell (which is ultimately necessary for nerve conduction); neosaxitoxin and several of the conotoxins also bind the same site.

The use of this toxin as a biochemical probe has elucidated two distinct types of voltage-gated sodium channels present in mammals: tetrodotoxin-sensitive voltage-gated sodium channels (TTX-s Na+ channels) and tetrodotoxin-resistant voltage-gated sodium channels (TTX-r Na+ channels). Tetrodotoxin inhibits TTX-s Na+ channels at concentrations of around 1–10 nM, whereas micromolar concentrations of tetrodotoxin are required to inhibit TTX-r Na+ channels. Nerve cells containing TTX-r Na+ channels are located primarily in cardiac tissue, while nerve cells containing TTX-s Na+ channels dominate the rest of the body.

TTX and its analogs have historically been important agents for use as chemical tool compounds, for use in channel characterization and in fundamental studies of channel function. The prevalence of TTX-s Na+ channels in the central nervous system makes tetrodotoxin a valuable agent for the silencing of neural activity within a cell culture.

Chemical synthesis 

In 1964, a team  of scientists led by Robert B. Woodward elucidated the structure of tetrodotoxin. The structure was confirmed by X-ray crystallography in 1970. Yoshito Kishi and coworkers reported the first total synthesis of racemic tetrodotoxin in 1972.  M. Isobe and coworkers and J. Du Bois reported the asymmetric total synthesis of tetrodotoxin in 2003. The two 2003 syntheses used very different strategies, with Isobe's route based on a Diels-Alder approach and Du Bois's work using C–H bond activation. Since then, methods have rapidly advanced, with several new strategies for the synthesis of tetrodotoxin having been developed.

Poisoning

Toxicity
TTX is extremely toxic. The Material Safety Data Sheet for TTX lists the oral median lethal dose (LD50) for mice as 334 μg per kg. For comparison, the oral LD50 of potassium cyanide for mice is 8,500 μg per kg, demonstrating that even orally, TTX is more poisonous than cyanide. TTX is even more dangerous if administered intravenously; the amount needed to reach a lethal dose by injection is 8 μg per kg in mice.

The toxin can enter the body of a victim by ingestion, injection, or inhalation, or through abraded skin.

Poisoning occurring as a consequence of consumption of fish from the order Tetraodontiformes is extremely serious. The organs (e.g. liver) of the pufferfish can contain levels of tetrodotoxin sufficient to produce the described paralysis of the diaphragm and corresponding death due to respiratory failure. Toxicity varies between species and at different seasons and geographic localities, and the flesh of many pufferfish may not be dangerously toxic.

The mechanism of toxicity is through the blockage of fast voltage-gated sodium channels, which are required for the normal transmission of signals between the body and brain. As a result, TTX causes loss of sensation, and paralysis of voluntary muscles including the diaphragm and intercostal muscles, stopping breathing.

History 

The therapeutic uses of puffer fish (tetraodon) eggs were mentioned in the first Chinese pharmacopoeia Pen-T’so Ching (The Book of Herbs, allegedly 2838–2698 BC by Shennong; but a later date is more likely), where they were classified as having "medium" toxicity, but could have a tonic effect when used at the correct dose. The principal use was "to arrest convulsive diseases".  In the Pen-T’so Kang Mu (Index Herbacea or The Great Herbal by Li Shih-Chen, 1596) some types of the fish Ho-Tun (the current Chinese name for tetraodon) were also recognized as both toxic yet, at the right dose, useful as part of a tonic. Increased toxicity in Ho-Tun was noted in fish caught at sea (rather than river) after the month of March. It was recognized that the most poisonous parts were the liver and eggs, but that toxicity could be reduced by soaking the eggs, noting that tetrodotoxin is slightly water-soluble, and soluble at 1 mg/ml in slightly acidic solutions.

The German physician Engelbert Kaempfer, in his "A History of Japan" (translated and published in English in 1727), described how well known the toxic effects of the fish were, to the extent that it would be used for suicide and that the Emperor specifically decreed that soldiers were not permitted to eat it. There is also evidence from other sources that knowledge of such toxicity was widespread throughout southeast Asia and India.

The first recorded cases of TTX poisoning affecting Westerners are from the logs of Captain James Cook from 7 September 1774. On that date Cook recorded his crew eating some local tropic fish (pufferfish), then feeding the remains to the pigs kept on board. The crew experienced numbness and shortness of breath, while the pigs were all found dead the next morning. In hindsight, it is clear that the crew survived a mild dose of tetrodotoxin, while the pigs ate the pufferfish body parts that contain most of the toxin, thus being fatally poisoned.

The toxin was first isolated and named in 1909 by Japanese scientist Dr. Yoshizumi Tahara.  It was one of the agents studied by Japan's Unit 731, which evaluated biological weapons on human subjects in the 1930s.

Symptoms and treatment 
The diagnosis of pufferfish poisoning is based on the observed symptomatology and recent dietary history.

Symptoms typically develop within 30 minutes of ingestion, but may be delayed by up to four hours; however, if the dose is fatal, symptoms are usually present within 17 minutes of ingestion. Paresthesia of the lips and tongue is followed by developing paresthesia in the extremities, hypersalivation, sweating, headache, weakness, lethargy, incoordination, tremor, paralysis, cyanosis, aphonia, dysphagia, and seizures. The gastrointestinal symptoms are often severe and include nausea, vomiting, diarrhea, and abdominal pain; death is usually secondary to respiratory failure. There is increasing respiratory distress, speech is affected, and the victim usually exhibits dyspnea, mydriasis, and hypotension. Paralysis increases, and convulsions, mental impairment, and cardiac arrhythmia may occur. The victim, although completely paralyzed, may be conscious and in some cases completely lucid until shortly before death, which generally occurs within 4 to 6 hours (range ~20 minutes to ~8 hours). However, some victims enter a coma.

If the patient survives 24 hours, recovery without any residual effects will usually occur over a few days.

Therapy is supportive and based on symptoms, with aggressive early airway management. If ingested, treatment can consist of emptying the stomach, feeding the victim activated charcoal to bind the toxin, and taking standard life-support measures to keep the victim alive until the effect of the poison has worn off.  Alpha adrenergic agonists are recommended in addition to intravenous fluids to combat hypotension; anticholinesterase agents "have been proposed as a treatment option but have not been tested adequately".

No antidote has been developed and approved for human use, but a primary research report (preliminary result) indicates that a monoclonal antibody specific to tetrodotoxin is in development by USAMRIID that was effective, in the one study, for reducing toxin lethality in tests on mice.

Geographic frequency of toxicity 

Poisonings from tetrodotoxin have been almost exclusively associated with the consumption of pufferfish from waters of the Indo-Pacific Ocean regions. Pufferfishes from other regions are much less commonly eaten. Several reported cases of poisonings, including fatalities, involved pufferfish from the Atlantic Ocean, Gulf of Mexico, and Gulf of California. There have been no confirmed cases of tetrodotoxicity from the Atlantic pufferfish, Sphoeroides maculatus, but in three studies, extracts from fish of this species were highly toxic in mice. Several recent intoxications from these fishes in Florida were due to saxitoxin, which causes paralytic shellfish poisoning with very similar symptoms and signs. The trumpet shell Charonia sauliae has been implicated in food poisonings, and evidence suggests it contains a tetrodotoxin derivative. There have been several reported poisonings from mislabelled pufferfish, and at least one report of a fatal episode in Oregon when an individual swallowed a rough-skinned newt Taricha granulosa.

In 2009, a major scare in the Auckland Region of New Zealand was sparked after several dogs died eating Pleurobranchaea maculata (grey side-gilled seaslug) on beaches. Children and pet owners were asked to avoid beaches, and recreational fishing was also interrupted for a time. After exhaustive analysis, it was found that the sea slugs must have ingested tetrodotoxin.

Statistical factors

Statistics from the Tokyo Bureau of Social Welfare and Public Health indicate 20–44 incidents of fugu poisoning per year between 1996 and 2006 in the entire country, leading to 34–64 hospitalizations and 0–6 deaths per year, for an average fatality rate of 6.8%. Of the 23 incidents recorded within Tokyo between 1993 and 2006, only one took place in a restaurant, while the others all involved fishermen eating their catch. From 2006 through 2009 in Japan there were 119 incidents involving 183 people but only 7 people died.

Only a few cases have been reported in the United States, and outbreaks in countries outside the Indo-Pacific area are rare. In Haiti, tetrodotoxin is thought to have been used in voodoo preparations, in so-called zombie poisons, where subsequent careful analysis has repeatedly called early studies into question on technical grounds, and have failed to identify the toxin in any preparation, such that discussion of the matter has all but disappeared from the primary literature since the early 1990s. Kao and Yasumoto  concluded in the first of their papers in 1986 that "the widely circulated claim in the lay press to the effect that tetrodotoxin is the causal agent in the initial zombification process is without factual foundation."

Genetic background is not a factor in susceptibility to tetrodotoxin poisoning. This toxicosis may be avoided by not consuming animal species known to contain tetrodotoxin, principally pufferfish; other tetrodotoxic species are not usually consumed by humans.

Fugu as a food
Poisoning from tetrodotoxin is of particular public health concern in Japan, where "fugu" is a traditional delicacy. It is prepared and sold in special restaurants where trained and licensed chefs carefully remove the viscera to reduce the danger of poisoning. There is potential for misidentification and mislabelling, particularly of prepared, frozen fish products.

Food analysis 
The mouse bioassay developed for paralytic shellfish poisoning (PSP) can be used to monitor tetrodotoxin in pufferfish and is the current method of choice. An HPLC method with post-column reaction with alkali and fluorescence has been developed to determine tetrodotoxin and its associated toxins. The alkali degradation products can be confirmed as their trimethylsilyl derivatives by gas chromatography/mass spectrometry.

Detection in body fluids 
Tetrodotoxin may be quantified in serum, whole blood or urine to confirm a diagnosis of poisoning in hospitalized patients or to assist in the forensic investigation of a case of fatal overdosage. Most analytical techniques involve mass spectrometric detection following gas or liquid chromatographic separation.

Modern therapeutic research 

Tetrodotoxin has been investigated as a possible treatment for cancer-associated pain. Early clinical trials demonstrate significant pain relief in some patients.

In addition to the cancer pain application mentioned, mutations in one particular TTX-sensitive Na+ channel are associated with some migraine headaches, although it is unclear as to whether this has any therapeutic relevance for most people with migraine.

Tetrodotoxin has been used clinically to relieve the headache associated with heroin withdrawal.

Regulation 

In the U.S., tetrodotoxin appears on the select agents list of the Department of Health and Human Services, and scientists must register with HHS to use tetrodotoxin in their research. However, investigators possessing less than 500 mg are exempt from regulation.

Popular culture
Tetrodotoxin serves as a plot device for characters to fake death, as in the films Hello Again (1987), The Serpent and the Rainbow (1988), The A-Team (2010) and Captain America: The Winter Soldier (2014), War (2019), and in episodes of "Jane the Virgin", Miami Vice (1985), Nikita, MacGyver Season 7, Episode 6, where the antidote is Datura stramonium leaf, CSI: NY (Season 4, episode 9 "Boo") and Chuck. In Law Abiding Citizen (2009) and Alex Cross (2012), its paralysis is presented as a method of assisting torture. The toxin was also referenced in "synthetic form" in the S1E2 of the series "FBI". The toxin is used as a weapon in both the second season of Archer, in Covert Affairs and in the Inside No. 9 episode "The Riddle of the Sphinx".

Based on the presumption that tetrodotoxin is not always fatal, but at near-lethal doses can leave a person extremely unwell with the person remaining conscious, tetrodotoxin has been alleged to result in zombieism, and has been suggested as an ingredient in Haitian Vodou preparations. This idea first appeared in the 1938 non-fiction book Tell My Horse by Zora Neale Hurston in which there were multiple accounts of purported tetrodotoxin poisoning in Haiti by a voodoo sorcerer called the Bokor. These stories were later popularized by Harvard-trained ethnobotanist Wade Davis in his 1985 book and Wes Craven's 1988 film, both titled The Serpent and the Rainbow. James Ellroy includes "blowfish toxin" as an ingredient in Haitian Vodou preparations to produce zombieism and poisoning deaths in his dark, disturbing, violent novel Blood's a Rover.  But this theory has been questioned by the scientific community since the 1990s based on analytical chemistry-based tests of multiple preparations and review of earlier reports (see above).

See also 
 Clairvius Narcisse, Haitian man allegedly buried alive under the effect of TTX
 Tetrodocain, North Korean medical injection derived from tetrodotoxin
 4-Aminopyridine
 Brevetoxin
 Ciguatoxin
 Conotoxin
 Domoic acid
 Neosaxitoxin
 Neurotoxin
 Okadaic acid
 Saxitoxin
 Tectin

References

Further reading

External links 
 
 Tetrodotoxin: essential data (1999)
 Tetrodotoxin from the Bad Bug Book at the U.S. Food and Drug Administration website
 New York Times, "Whatever Doesn't Kill Some Animals Can Make Them Deadly"
U.S. National Library of Medicine: Hazardous Substances Databank – Tetrodotoxin

Marine neurotoxins
Ion channel toxins
Guanidine alkaloids
Biological toxin weapons
Alcohols
Ichthyotoxins
Sodium channel blockers
Orthoesters
Adamantane-like molecules
Secondary metabolites
Analgesics
Non-protein ion channel toxins
Zwitterions
Voltage-gated sodium channel blockers
Octopus toxins